Taourirt is a village in northern Algeria. It is located in Bouïra Province.

Nearby towns and villages include Tassift (3.0 nm), M'Chedallah(3.1 nm), Chorfa (2.6 nm), Boudjellil (1.9 nm) and Sidi Brahim (5.9 nm). 
 
The place is located along the N5 road which leads to Adjiba.

References

External links
Satellite map at Maplandia.com

Populated places in Bouïra Province
Villages in Algeria